Ralph Walter Graystone Wyckoff, Sr. (August 9, 1897 in Geneva, New York – November 3, 1994 in Tucson, Arizona) was an American scientist and pioneer of X-ray crystallography. He was elected member of the National Academy of Sciences in 1949 and Foreign member of the Royal Society, on April 19, 1951.

Biography
He was the son of judge Abram Ralph Wyckoff and Ethel Agnes Catchpole. He studied at Hobart College, where he made Bachelor of Science in 1916, continued at Cornell University, where he obtained his Ph.D. in 1919.  In 1916, he published his first scientific paper (of more than 400) at the age of nineteen in the Journal of the American Chemical Society. Under Shoji Nishikawa, he presented his thesis about the crystallographic resolution of the structures of NaNO3 and CsICl2 in 1919.

He continued working in X-ray crystallography and wrote several books about the topic. Wyckoff's 1922 book, The Analytical Expression of the Results of the Theory of Space Groups, contained tables with the positional coordinates, both general and special, permitted by the symmetry elements. This book was the forerunner of International Tables for X-ray Crystallography, which first appeared in 1935.  Both general and special positions are also called Wyckoff positions in his honor.

He moved to the Rockefeller University (then called The Rockefeller Institute for Medical Research) in 1927, to take up studies of bacteria and, especially, viruses. While there, he photographed the growth of living cells using ultraviolet light and determined the structure of urea.  He left Rockefeller in 1937. After leaving there, he worked in private industry on the Western equine encephalitis virus. This work resulted to the creation of a vaccine against it.  During World War II, he developed a vaccine against epidemic typhus.  In 1943, he moved to Michigan where he worked for the University of Michigan and the Michigan State Department of Health   In Ann Arbor, he invented a technique to take three-dimensional electron microscope images of bacteria using a "metal shadowing" technique. Robley C. Williams worked with him to develop the technique.  From 1946 to 1952, he researched macromolecules and viruses at the National Institutes of Health in Bethesda, Maryland.  In 1948, he helped found the International Union of Crystallography and served as vice-president and president from 1951 to 1957.  In 1959, appalled by growing bureaucracy at the NIH, he took the job of professor of microbiology and physics at the University of Arizona in Tucson, where he was forced to retire at the age of 80.

Wyckoff was married two times, the first time producing one son Ralph W.G. Wyckoff, Jr., the second marriage resulted in three daughters.

Bibliography

References

External links 

 https://www.iucr.org/publ/50yearsofxraydiffraction/full-text/wyckoff
https://www.iucr.org/people/crystallographers/ralph-w.-g.-wyckoff-1897-1994

Cornell University alumni
Hobart and William Smith Colleges alumni
University of Arizona faculty
Wyckoff family
1994 deaths
1897 births
Foreign Members of the Royal Society
University of Michigan staff
Presidents of the American Crystallographic Association
Rockefeller University people
Fellows of the American Physical Society